Walanae River is a river in South Sulawesi on the island of Sulawesi, Indonesia, about 1500 km northeast of the capital Jakarta.

Geography
The river flows in the southwest area of Sulawesi with predominantly tropical monsoon climate (designated as Am in the Köppen-Geiger climate classification). The annual average temperature in the area is 23 °C. The warmest month is October, when the average temperature is around 25 °C, and the coldest is July, at 21 °C. The average annual rainfall is 2550 mm. The wettest month is January, with an average of 404 mm rainfall, and the driest is September, with 29 mm rainfall.

See also
List of rivers of Indonesia
List of rivers of Sulawesi

References

External links 
  Lake Tempe, Ancient Lake of Sulawesi
  Watershed areas on the island of Sulawesi

Rivers of South Sulawesi
Rivers of Indonesia